Evans Comprehensive High School is a public high school located in Evans, north of Augusta, Georgia, United States. It serves students in grades 9–12 in the Columbia County School System.

Notable alumni
Rick Allen  U.S. Representative for Georgia's 12th congressional district
Hunter Foster, musical theater actor/singer, librettist, and playwright
Todd Greene, MLB baseball player
Forrest Griffin, professional mixed martial artist
Ben Hayslip, country music songwriter
Kathryn McCormick, dancer and actress
CJ Pearson, political commentator

References

External links
Evans High School website
Columbia County Board of Education

High schools in Columbia County, Georgia
Public high schools in Georgia (U.S. state)